Metal-complex dyes are a family of dyes that contain metals coordinated to the organic portion.  Many azo dyes, especially those derived form naphthols, form metal complexes by complexation of one of the azo nitrogen centers.  The insertion of the metal into the organic ligand often involves redox reactions, e.g. pre-reaction of sodium dichromate with glucose.  Phthalocyanine (Pc) complexes, such as CuPc, are another important family of metal complex dyes.

References